This is a list of Hungarian football transfers in the summer transfer window 2015 by club. Only transfers in Nemzeti Bajnokság I, and Nemzeti Bajnokság II are included.

Nemzeti Bajnokság I

Békéscsaba

In:

Out:

Budapest Honvéd

In:

Out:

Debrecen

In:

Out:

Diósgyőri

In:

Out:

Ferencvárosi

In:

Out:

Haladás

In:

Out:

Paks

In:

Out:

Puskás Akadémia

In:

Out:

Újpest

In:

Out:

Vasas

In:

Out:

Videoton

In:

Out:

Nemzeti Bajnokság II

Balmazújvárosi

In:

Out:

Gyrimót

In:

Out:

Kecskeméti

In:

Out:

Mezőkövesd-Zsóry

In:

Out:

Nyíregyháza Spartacus

In:

Out:

Soproni

In:

Out:

See also
 2015–16 Nemzeti Bajnokság I
 2015–16 Nemzeti Bajnokság II
 2015–16 Nemzeti Bajnokság III
 2015–16 Magyar Kupa

References

External links
 Official site of the Hungarian Football Association
 Official site of the Nemzeti Bajnokság I

Hungarian
Football transfers
2015